Spirit of the age is an English translation of the German phrase Zeitgeist. It may refer to:

Music
 "Spirit of the Age", a 1977 song by Hawkwind
 Spirit of the Age (album), a 1988 Hawkwind compilation album
 Spirit of the Age Anthology, a 2008 Hawkwind compilation album

Other
 Spirit of the Age (1975 TV series), a BBC television series about architecture
 The Spirit of the Age, an 1825 collection of essays by William Hazlitt

See also
 Zeitgeist (disambiguation)